Events from the year 1781 in Russia

Incumbents
 Monarch – Catherine II

Events

 
 
  
  
 
 
 
 Austro-Russian alliance (1781)
 Greek Church and Greek School (Taganrog)
 Osinsky Uyezd
 Perm Governorate

Births

Deaths

 Ekaterina Orlova (courtier)

References

1781 in Russia
Years of the 18th century in the Russian Empire